Club Lemos is a Spanish football team based in Monforte de Lemos, in the autonomous community of Galicia. Founded in 1924, it plays in Primeira Autonómica – Group 3, holding home matches at Campo Municipal A Pinguela.

Season to season

51 seasons in Tercera División

Notable former players
 Albert Stroni

External links
Official website
Futbolme.com profile 

Football clubs in Galicia (Spain)
Divisiones Regionales de Fútbol clubs
Association football clubs established in 1924
1924 establishments in Spain
Club Lemos